The European Physical Journal E: Soft Matter and Biological Physics is a scientific journal focusing on the physics of soft matter and biophysics. It publishes papers describing advances in the understanding of physical aspects of soft, liquid and living systems. This includes reports of experimental, computational and theoretical studies and appeals to the broad interdisciplinary communities including physics, chemistry, biology and materials science.

Topics covered include:

Soft matter
Polymers and polyelectrolytes
Liquid crystals
Macromolecular self-assembly
Colloids and nanoparticles
Granular matter
Nanodevices (smart materials)
Surface physics

Biological physics
Biological matter (RNA, DNA, chromatin, ...)
Structure and function of nanostructures
Biomimetics
Cellular processes
Multicellular systems (Tissue, organs)
Biological networks

See also
European Physical Journal

References

External links 
 

Biophysics journals
Physics journals
Springer Science+Business Media academic journals
EDP Sciences academic journals
Publications established in 2000
Monthly journals
English-language journals